Haversian canals (sometimes canals of Havers) are a series of microscopic tubes in the outermost region of bone called cortical bone. They allow blood vessels and nerves to travel through them to supply the osteocytes.

Structure 
Each Haversian canal generally contains one or two capillaries and many nerve fibres. The channels are formed by concentric layers called lamellae, which are approximately 50 µm in diameter. The Haversian canals surround blood vessels and nerve cells throughout bones and communicate with osteocytes (contained in spaces within the dense bone matrix called lacunae) through connections called canaliculi. This unique arrangement is conducive to mineral salt deposits and storage which gives bone tissue its strength. Active transport is used to move most substances between the blood vessels and the osteocytes.

Haversian canals are contained within osteons, which are typically arranged along the long axis of the bone in parallel to the surface. The canals and the surrounding lamellae (8-15) form the functional unit, called a Haversian system, or osteon.

Clinical significance

Fracture 
Blood vessels in the Haversian canals are likely to be damaged by bone fracture. This can cause haematoma.

Rheumatoid arthritis 
Haversian canals may be wider in patients with rheumatoid arthritis. They are also more likely to contain osteoclasts that break down bone structure. These differences are studied with light microscopy.

History 
Haversian canals were first described (and probably discovered) by British physician Clopton Havers, after whom they are named. He described them in his 1691 work Osteologica Nova.

Notes

References

External links
 http://www.lab.anhb.uwa.edu.au/mb140/ 
  Video of haversian canal system within cortical bone.

Additional images

Skeletal system